WFGX (channel 35) is a television station licensed to Fort Walton Beach, Florida, United States, serving northwest Florida and southwest Alabama as an affiliate of MyNetworkTV. It is owned by Sinclair Broadcast Group alongside Pensacola-licensed ABC affiliate WEAR-TV (channel 3); Sinclair also provides certain services to Mobile, Alabama–licensed NBC affiliate WPMI-TV (channel 15) and Pensacola-licensed independent station WJTC (channel 44) under a local marketing agreement (LMA) with Deerfield Media.

WFGX and WEAR-TV share studios—which also house master control and some internal operations for WPMI-TV and WJTC—on Mobile Highway (US 90) in unincorporated Escambia County, Florida (with a Pensacola mailing address); WFGX's transmitter is located in unincorporated Baldwin County, Alabama (northeast of Robertsdale).

History
The station signed on the air on April 7, 1987, as an independent station; it was the second independent station on the Florida side of the market, after Pensacola-based WJTC.

In 1995, WFGX's original local owners entered into a local marketing agreement (LMA) with Heritage Media, then-owner of WEAR. This enabled WFGX to become the area's WB affiliate on September 29, 1996, taking the affiliation from WBQP-CD. The station's former analog signal on UHF channel 35 was very weak (509 kilowatts), resulting in marginal (at best) reception outside Okaloosa County. It was barely viewable even in Pensacola, and could not be seen at all over the air on the Alabama side of the market. Despite the shortfall in coverage, WFGX has long identified as "Pensacola/Fort Walton Beach," which is unusual since the city of license is normally listed first when a station references another city in its legal on-air identification. It had to rely on cable and satellite carriage in order to reach the entire market.

Sinclair Broadcast Group took over WFGX's operations after Heritage sold its television division to Sinclair in 1997. When the stronger WBPG (channel 55, now WFNA) signed on from Gulf Shores, Alabama on September 2, 2001, it replaced WFGX as the area's WB affiliate. WFGX then became an independent station, airing home shopping programming from Jewelry Television, syndicated shows and infomercials. Sinclair purchased WFGX outright in 2004.

On February 22, 2006, News Corporation announced that it would launch a new network called MyNetworkTV, which would be operated by Fox Television Stations and its syndication division Twentieth Television. Sinclair opted to affiliate several of its stations (including WFGX) with the new programming service, which launched on September 5, 2006.

WFGX discontinued regular programming on its analog signal, over UHF channel 35, on June 12, 2009, the official date in which full-power television stations in the United States transitioned from analog to digital broadcasts under federal mandate. The station's digital signal remained on its pre-transition UHF channel 50. Through the use of PSIP, digital television receivers display the station's virtual channel as its former UHF analog channel 35.

At the same time, WFGX increased its digital signal to 1 million watts (equivalent to 5 million watts in analog), which was enough to provide a good signal to viewers in Pensacola. However, it was still practically unviewable on the Alabama side of the market. In July 2010, WFGX's digital transmitter was moved from Gulf Breeze, Florida to WEAR's tower east of Rosinton. With the same power output at the new location, it is now able to offer a signal comparable to those of the other full-powered stations in the market. Within two months, the station began offering a high definition signal over-the-air for the first time.

WFGX runs some programming from Sinclair's Stadium network, mainly local sporting events that are part of the network's national schedule (it otherwise airs on WPMI-DT3).

Newscasts

In 1996, WFGX began producing nightly newscasts at 6:30 and 9:00 p.m. called Emerald Coast News originating from its original studios on Beach Drive in Fort Walton Beach. Each broadcast aired for 30 minutes and stories on the newscasts specifically focused on Okaloosa County, Florida, helping to provide better coverage for WEAR. On December 11, 1998, Emerald Coast News was canceled by WFGX.

On August 12, 2013, sister station WEAR-TV began producing a weeknight-only, half-hour prime time newscast at 9:00 p.m. for WFGX. The newscast competes with Fox affiliate WALA-TV (channel 10)'s long established, dominant and hour-long 9:00 p.m. newscast, but due to WEAR's Pensacola focus, provides some differing content from WALA's Mobile-centric news operation.

Subchannels
The station's digital signal is multiplexed:

Cable and satellite coverage
For most of its history, WFGX was unavailable to cable customers on the Alabama side of the market, largely because its analog signal could not be seen at all in that area. Comcast's Mobile system did not carry WFGX until October 2010. Eventually, with the transmitter move to the WEAR tower, Sinclair was able to claim must-carry with retransmission consent, requiring cable providers to carry WFGX as a condition of carrying WEAR, and it was added to most market providers.

References

External links
WFGX "My TV 35"
WEAR-TV

Television channels and stations established in 1987
FGX
MyNetworkTV affiliates
GetTV affiliates
Comet (TV network) affiliates
Sinclair Broadcast Group
1987 establishments in Florida